Kauko Jalkanen (8 December 1918 – 3 September 2007) was a Finnish épée, foil and sabre fencer. He competed at the 1948 and 1952 Summer Olympics.

References

External links
 

1918 births
2007 deaths
People from Heinola
Finnish male épée fencers
Olympic fencers of Finland
Fencers at the 1948 Summer Olympics
Fencers at the 1952 Summer Olympics
Finnish male foil fencers
Finnish male sabre fencers
Sportspeople from Päijät-Häme